Sciaphilini is a weevil tribe in the subfamily Entiminae.

Genera 
Abarypeithes – Alocyrtus – Ameladus – Amicromias – Archeophloeus – Balchaschia – Barypeithes – Brachysomus – Chaetopantus – Chilodrosus – Chiloneus – Chilonorrhinus – Chionostagon – Cyclomias – Cyrtops – Dinas – Dinosius – Edmundia – Euidosomus – Eusomatus – Eusomomorphus – Eusomus – Foucartia – Hypsomias – Mitostylus – Mylacomorphus – Mylochlamys – Ochnodes – Omiocratus – Paophilus – Pareusomus – Platycopes – Pleurodirus – Plochomorphus – Pseudoptochus – Sauromates – Sciaphilomorphus – Sciaphilus – Sciaphobus – Sciomias – Sericopholus – Stasiodis – Svnaptorhinus – Synechops – Tapinomorphus – Tylauchen – Wittmerella – †Archaeosciaphilus

References 

 Sharp, D. 1891: Rhynchophora. Curculionidae. Attelabinae, Pterocolinae, Allocoryninae, Apioninae, Thecesterninae., Otiorhynchinae [part,"Apterae"]. Biologia Centrali-Americana. Insecta, Coleoptera. Vol.: 4. Part: 3. : 137–168.
 Alonso-Zarazaga, M.A.; Lyal, C.H.C. 1999: A world catalogue of families and genera of Curculionoidea (Insecta: Coleoptera) (excepting Scolytidae and Platypodidae). Entomopraxis, Barcelona.

External links 

Entiminae
Beetle tribes